Molly Patricia Schaus (born July 29, 1988) is an American retired ice hockey goaltender and coach. As a member of the United States women's national ice hockey team, she was a two-time Olympic medalist and five-time World Championship medalist. She was drafted 2nd overall by the Boston Blades in the 2011 CWHL Draft.

Early life
Schaus was born in Voorhees, New Jersey and shortly after moved to the Minneapolis, Minnesota. There she learned to skate on the back yard pond with her brothers, Mike and Steve. At age 7 she and her family relocated to Naperville, Illinois and began her early years of formal hockey. During these years Molly played hockey for Team Illinois. She again relocated after her freshman year in high school (Benet Academy of Lisle, Illinois) to Natick, Massachusetts.  Playing for both Deerfield Academy and Assabet Valley during her high school years, she was recruited to play hockey at Boston College. After completing her Olympic Team commitment, she returned to Boston College to finish her senior year. Her family now lives in Natick. She has two brothers, Steven and Michael, and is the daughter of David and Cathy Schaus.

Schaus learned to skate on a pond behind her childhood home in Minnesota, and she moved to hockey from figure skating to follow hockey-playing older brothers. The brothers also dictated her position in the goal. Then, "[w]atching Team USA take home the gold medal in 1998, during the first Olympic Games to include women’s hockey, Schaus became hooked on the sport, the team, and the players. Also she played on the 2005–06 Assabet Valley U19 girls' team ... Won five state championships, had two third-place finishes and a second-place finish at the USA Hockey Girls' National Championships ... Received two MVP awards in hockey at Deerfield ... Awarded William Jaffe Cup for sportsmanship and leadership at Deerfield .

She became friendly with Cammi Granato, the team’s captain, who lived in a neighboring town after Schaus and her family moved from Minnesota to the Chicago area. [Schaus] plays for another member of the 1998 squad, Katie King, the head women’s hockey coach at Boston College, and is a friend and teammate of Angela Ruggiero, who was on the US squad for the Vancouver Games too."

Playing career

NCAA
At the conclusion of the 2010–11 regular season, Schaus is ranked third in the NCAA in goals against average (1.42), fifth in save percentage (.941) sixth in winning percentage (.793), and tied for 11th in shutouts (4). She leads Hockey East in goals against average and save percentage and is second in winning percentage. On January 30, 2011, Schaus earned her first career assist in a 2–1 defeat of Northeastern. She stopped a slapshot which rebounded to Kelli Stack. Stack skated the length of the rink and scored a shorthanded goal, which was also the game winner.

Schaus received the Bertagna Goaltending Award (given to the Beanpot tournament outstanding goalie) for the third time in her career following BC's win in the Beanpot Championship, the third Schaus has been a part of during her four years at the Heights.

Molly Schaus was among 10 finalists nominated for the 2011 Patty Kazmaier Memorial Award, presented by Lake Erie College of Osteopathic Medicine. An award of The USA Hockey Foundation, the Patty Kazmaier Memorial Award is annually bestowed upon the top player in NCAA Division I women's ice hockey. Schaus was nominated for the award in 2009, advancing to become a finalist.

Molly Schaus earned American Hockey Coaches Association All-America honors for 2011 in capturing first-team honors. Schaus received All-America second-team recognition as a junior in 2008–09.

At Boston College for the 2010–2011 season, Schaus topped her own school wins record this season by going 24–5–4. She was selected as the All-America First Team goaltender. The senior boasted a save percentage of .942 and 1.45 goals against average to help guide BC to the Frozen Four. Schaus ended her tenure as an Eagle with numerous school records, including saves (3,428), GAA (1.81) and wins (80).

USA Hockey
In Vancouver, Schaus did not play in the 2–0 loss in the final to Team Canada, and along with her teammates, brought home a silver medal. She was in the goal and unscored upon for 52 minutes in the opening game, a 12–1 blowout of China, with Vice President Joe Biden and 1980 "Miracle on Ice" men's hockey gold medalist and captain Mike Eruzione together in the stands. In the gold medal game of the 2010 Four Nations Cup, Molly Schaus faced 52 shots, including 20 in a scoreless third period. In overtime, Schaus faced 11 shots.
 In the fourth game of the 2011 IIHF 12 Nations Tournament, Schaus earned a shutout in a 4–0 defeat of Canada. In a March 31, 2012 exhibition game versus Canada, Schaus was scored on by Laura Fortino in a 1–0 loss at the Ottawa Civic Centre. It was the first international goal scored by Fortino.

When not playing or training, Molly loves visiting her family in Buffalo, NY, where both her parents as well as her brothers were born.

Awards and honors

USA Hockey
Two-time member of the U.S. Women's National Team for the International Ice Hockey Federation World Women's Championship (gold-2008-09) ... Member of the U.S. Women's Select Team for the 2008 Four Nations Cup (1st) ... Two-time member of the U.S. Women's Under-22 Select Team for the Under-22 Series with Canada (2007–08) ... Three-time USA Hockey Women's National Festival participant (2007–09) ... Five-time USA Hockey Player Development Camp attendee (2002–06).

College
As a Junior (2008–09): Completed her third season at Boston College of Hockey East ... Recorded an NCAA second-best .938 save percentage ... Ranked second in the nation with 10 shutouts ... Top-10 finalist for the Patty Kazmaier Memorial Award ... Named Hockey East First Team All-Star and earned a spot on the Hockey East All-Tournament Team ... Named to Hockey East's All-Academic Team. As a Sophomore (2007–08): Broke the school's single-season record with 920 saves ... Named to Hockey East's All-Academic Team. As a Freshman (2006–07): Led team to its first-ever NCAA Women's Frozen Four berth ... Posted a league-best .931 save percentage and school-record 1.90 GAA ... Stopped 73 shots on Feb. 6 in the Beanpot semifinal against Harvard to break the previous NCAA record of 70 and earn the Beanpot's Bertagna Award ... Made 45 and 47 saves against Dartmouth College and the University of Minnesota Duluth in back-to-back double overtime NCAA tournament games ... Hockey East Second Team All-Star selection ... Unanimous selection to the Hockey East All-Rookie Team ... Earned the Athletic Director's Award for Academic Achievement ... BC's Scholar-Athlete Award recipient .... Named to Hockey East's All-Academic Team.

 2009 Patty Kazmaier Award nominee
 2011 Patty Kazmaier Award nominee
 2011 Bertagna Goaltending Award 
 2011 All-Hockey East First Team
 2011 First Team All-America selection
 2010–11 New England Women's Division I All-Stars 
 Hockey East 10th Anniversary Team selection

References

External links
 
 

1988 births
Living people
American women's ice hockey goaltenders
Boston Blades players
Boston College Eagles women's ice hockey players
Clarkson Cup champions
Ice hockey players from Illinois
Ice hockey players from New Jersey
Ice hockey players at the 2010 Winter Olympics
Ice hockey players at the 2014 Winter Olympics
Medalists at the 2010 Winter Olympics
Medalists at the 2014 Winter Olympics
Olympic silver medalists for the United States in ice hockey
People from Voorhees Township, New Jersey
Sportspeople from Naperville, Illinois